In mathematics, Fredholm operators are certain operators that arise in the Fredholm theory of integral equations. They are named in honour of Erik Ivar Fredholm. By definition, a Fredholm operator is a bounded linear operator T : X → Y between two Banach spaces with finite-dimensional kernel  and finite-dimensional (algebraic) cokernel , and with closed range . The last condition is actually redundant.

The index of a Fredholm operator is the integer

or in other words,

Properties
Intuitively, Fredholm operators are those operators that are invertible "if finite-dimensional effects are ignored." The formally correct statement follows. A bounded operator T : X → Y between Banach spaces  X and Y is Fredholm if and only if it is invertible modulo compact operators, i.e., if there exists a bounded linear operator

such that

are compact operators on X and Y respectively.

If a Fredholm operator is modified slightly, it stays Fredholm and its index remains the same. Formally: The set of Fredholm operators from X to Y is open in the Banach space L(X, Y) of bounded linear operators, equipped with the operator norm, and the index is locally constant.  More precisely, if T0 is Fredholm from X to Y, there exists ε > 0 such that every T in L(X, Y) with ||T − T0|| < ε is Fredholm, with the same index as that of T0.

When T is Fredholm from X to Y and U Fredholm from Y to Z, then the composition  is Fredholm from X to Z and

When X and Y are Hilbert spaces, the same conclusion holds for the Hermitian adjoint T∗.

When T is Fredholm and K a compact operator, then T + K is Fredholm.

Invariance by perturbation is true for larger classes than the class of compact operators.  For example, when U is Fredholm and T a strictly singular operator, then T + U is Fredholm with the same index.  The class of inessential operators, which properly contains the class of strictly singular operators, is the "perturbation class" for Fredholm operators.  This means an operator  is inessential if and only if T+U is Fredholm for every Fredholm operator .

Examples
Let  be a Hilbert space with an orthonormal basis  indexed by the non negative integers.  The (right) shift operator S on H is defined by

The adjoint S* is the left shift,

The left shift S* is Fredholm with index 1.

If H is the classical Hardy space  on the unit circle T in the complex plane, then the shift operator with respect to the orthonormal basis of complex exponentials

is the multiplication operator Mφ with the function .

Applications
Any elliptic operator can be extended to a Fredholm operator. The use of Fredholm operators in partial differential equations is an abstract form of the parametrix method.

The Atiyah-Singer index theorem gives a topological characterization of the index of certain operators on manifolds.

The Atiyah-Jänich theorem identifies the K-theory K(X) of a compact topological space X with the set of homotopy classes of continuous maps from X to the space of Fredholm operators H→H, where H is the separable Hilbert space and the set of these operators carries the operator norm.

Generalizations

B-Fredholm operators
 viewed as a map from  
  into   (  in particular  ).  
The index of a B-Fredholm operator  is defined as the index of the Fredholm operator . It is  shown that the index is independent of the integer .
B-Fredholm operators were introduced by M. Berkani in 1999 as a generalization of Fredholm operators.

Semi-Fredholm operators 
For a semi-Fredholm operator, the index is defined by

Unbounded operators
One may also define unbounded Fredholm operators. Let X and Y be two Banach spaces.

As it was noted above, the range of a closed operator is closed as long as the cokernel is finite-dimensional (Edmunds and Evans, Theorem I.3.2).

Notes

References
 D.E. Edmunds and W.D. Evans (1987), Spectral theory and differential operators, Oxford University Press. .
 A. G. Ramm, "A Simple Proof of the Fredholm Alternative and a Characterization of the Fredholm Operators", American Mathematical Monthly, 108 (2001) p. 855 (NB: In this paper the word "Fredholm operator" refers to "Fredholm operator of index 0").
 
 
 Bruce K. Driver, "Compact and Fredholm Operators and the Spectral Theorem", Analysis Tools with Applications, Chapter 35, pp. 579–600.
 Robert C. McOwen, "Fredholm theory of partial differential equations on complete Riemannian manifolds", Pacific J. Math.  87, no. 1 (1980), 169–185.
 Tomasz Mrowka, A Brief Introduction to Linear Analysis: Fredholm Operators, Geometry of Manifolds, Fall 2004 (Massachusetts Institute of Technology: MIT OpenCouseWare)

Fredholm theory
Linear operators